The Renegades is an American action crime drama television series about a street gang that becomes a special police undercover unit in order to avoid jail time. The show starred Patrick Swayze as "Bandit", the leader of the gang.

Cast
 Patrick Swayze as "Bandit"
 Randy Brooks as "Eagle"
 Paul Mones as J.T.
 Tracy Scoggins as Tracy
 Robert Thaler as "Dancer"
 Brian Tochi as "Dragon"
 Angel Granados Jr. (2-hour pilot) and Fausto Bara (post-pilot) as Gaucho
 James Luisi as Lieutenant Marciano
 Kurtwood Smith as Captain Scanlon

Episodes
The two-hour television movie backdoor pilot for this series aired on August 11, 1982.

Broadcast history
After the success of the movie The Warriors, Hollywood looked to take the youth gang concept and market it to TV.  In 1981, Swayze did a TV show, Return of the Rebels, about an aging motorcycle gang who get together to help a friend who owns a popular campground that is being threatened by a band of arrogant groupies.  However, the show didn't catch on and was quickly canceled.

Brother team Lawrence and Charles Gordon tried to market Swayze's rebel look, combine the gang concept with a police angle and came up with The Renegades.  Roger Spottiswoode directed the TV movie pilot that first broadcast on August 11, 1982 and a six-episode series was later broadcast in 1983. It had weak ratings and ABC cancelled the show.

Ratings

References

External links

Episode list

1983 American television series debuts
1983 American television series endings
1980s American crime drama television series
American action television series
English-language television shows
American Broadcasting Company original programming
Television series by CBS Studios
Television shows set in Michigan